Simon de Bovill was an English medieval friar and university chancellor.

Brother Simon de Bovill was a Prior of the Preaching Friars in Oxford. Between 1238–9 and 1244–6, Simon de Bovill was twice Chancellor of Oxford University.

References

Year of birth unknown
Year of death unknown
English priors
English Dominicans
English Roman Catholics
Chancellors of the University of Oxford
13th-century English people
13th-century Roman Catholics